Ellen Sarah Greenwood (19 February 1837–29 November 1917) was a New Zealand teacher and social worker. She was born in Mitcham, Surrey, England on 19 February 1837.

References

1837 births
1917 deaths
New Zealand educators
New Zealand social workers
People from Mitcham
English emigrants to New Zealand
19th-century New Zealand people